The year 1966 in film involved some significant events. A Man for All Seasons won six Academy Awards, including Best Picture.

Top-grossing films

North America

The top ten 1966 released films by box office gross in North America are as follows:

Outside North America
The highest-grossing 1966 films in countries outside North America.

Events
 October 19 – Gulf and Western Industries acquire Paramount Pictures.
 November – Seven Arts Productions reach agreement to acquire Warner Bros. for $32 million, later forming a new company Warner Bros.-Seven Arts.
 December 15 – Entertainment pioneer Walt Disney, best known for his creation of Mickey Mouse, breakthroughs in the field of animation, filmmaking, theme park design and other achievements, dies at the age of 65. He died while he was producing The Jungle Book, The Happiest Millionaire, and Winnie the Pooh and the Blustery Day; the last three films under his personal supervision.

Awards 

Academy Awards:
 
Best Picture: A Man for All Seasons – Highland, Columbia
Best Director: Fred Zinnemann – A Man for All Seasons
Best Actor: Paul Scofield – A Man for All Seasons
Best Actress: Elizabeth Taylor – Who's Afraid of Virginia Woolf?
Best Supporting Actor: Walter Matthau – The Fortune Cookie
Best Supporting Actress: Sandy Dennis – Who's Afraid of Virginia Woolf?
Best Foreign Language Film: A Man and a Woman (Un homme et une femme), directed by Claude Lelouch, France
	

BAFTA Film Awards:

Best Film from any Source: Who's Afraid of Virginia Woolf?
Best British film: The Spy Who Came In from the Cold

Golden Globe Awards:

Drama:
Best Picture: A Man for All Seasons
Best Actor: Paul Scofield – A Man for All Seasons
Best Actress: Anouk Aimée – A Man and a Woman
 
Comedy or Musical:
Best Picture: The Russians Are Coming, the Russians Are Coming
Best Actor: Alan Arkin – The Russians Are Coming, the Russians Are Coming
Best Actress: Lynn Redgrave – Georgy Girl

Other
Best Supporting Actor: Richard Attenborough – The Sand Pebbles
Best Supporting Actress: Jocelyne LaGarde – Hawaii
Best Director: Fred Zinnemann – A Man for All Seasons

Palme d'Or (Cannes Film Festival):
A Man and a Woman (Un homme et une femme), directed by Claude Lelouch, France
Signore & Signori (The Birds, the Bees and the Italians), directed by Pietro Germi, Italy

Italian National Syndicate of Film Journalists, Location: Italy

Silver Ribbon
Best Actor winner in Questa volta parliamo di uomini (This Time Let's Talk about Men): Nino Manfredi
Nominee in The 10th Victim: Marcello Mastroianni
A third nominee was not determined.
Best Actress winner in La fuga: Giovanna Ralli
Nominees in Juliet of the Spirits: Giulietta Masina and in The Mandrake: Rosanna Schiaffino
Best Supporting Actor winner in I Knew Her Well: Ugo Tognazzi
Nominees in The Mandrake: Totò and Romolo Valli
Best Supporting Actress winner in Juliet of the Spirits: Sandra Milo
Nominee in Made in Italy Anna Magnani
A third nominee was not determined.
Best Director winner in I Knew Her Well: Antonio Pietrangeli
Nominees in Fists in the Pocket: Marco Bellocchio and in Juliet of the Spirits: Federico Fellini
Best Foreign Director winner in The Servant: Joseph Losey
Nominees in Hamlet (1964 film): Grigori Kozintsev and in King and Country: Joseph Losey
Best Screenplay winner in I Knew Her Well: Ettore Scola, Antonio Pietrangeli and Ruggero Maccari
Nominees in Fists in the Pocket: Marco Bellocchio and in Sandra: Suso Cecchi d'Amico, Enrico Medioli, Luchino Visconti
Best Cinematography, B/W winner in Sandra: Armando Nannuzzi
Best Cinematography, Color winner in Juliet of the Spirits: Gianni Di Venanzo. In memory of.
Best Costume Design winner in Juliet of the Spirits: Piero Gherardi
Best Score winner in Seven Golden Men: Armando Trovajoli
Best Producer - Short Film winner in Con il cuore fermo Sicilia: Clodio Cinematografica
Best Short Film winner in Antonio Ligabue, pittore: Raffaele Andreassi
Best Original Story winner in Fists in the Pocket: Marco Bellocchio
Nominees in I Knew Her Well: Ruggero Maccari, Ettore Scola, Antonio Pietrangeli and in Seven Golden Men: Marco Vicario
Best Producer winner in Seven Golden Men: Marco Vicario
Nominee in Fists in the Pocket: Enzo Doria
A third nominee was not determined.
Best Production Design winner in Juliet of the Spirits: Piero Gherardi.

Golden Lion (Venice Film Festival):
The Battle of Algiers (La Battaglia di Algeri), directed by Gillo Pontecorvo, Algeria / Italy

Golden Bear (Berlin Film Festival):
Cul-de-sac, directed by Roman Polanski, United Kingdom

1966  film releases
United States unless stated

January–March
January 1966
5 January
7 Women
Agent for H.A.R.M.
9 January
Dracula: Prince of Darkness (U.K.)
16 January
Our Man Flint
20 January
The Ghost and Mr. Chicken
Judith
27 January
Moment to Moment
February 1966
2 February
The Rare Breed
9 February
Made in Paris
12 February
Drop Dead Darling
18 February
The Silencers
19 February
The Chase
21 February
Lord Love a Duck
23 February
Harper
25 February
The Sword of Doom (Japan)
March 1966
2 March
Blood Bath
4 March
The Group
The Oscar
5 March
The Magic Serpent (Japan)
9 March
Johnny Reno
14 March
Born Free (U.K.) 
War and Peace Part I (U.S.S.R)
25 March
A Man Could Get Killed (U.K.)
30 March
Cast a Giant Shadow
Hold On!
The Trouble with Angels
31 March
Frankie and Johnny

April–June
April 1966
1 April
Hold On!
4 April
The Singing Nun
6 April
Django
7 April
Hold Me While I'm Naked
10 April
Tokyo Drifter (Japan)
13 April
The Dirty Game
17 April
Daimajin (Japan)
Gamera vs. Barugon (Japan)
May 1966
5 May
Arabesque (U.K.)
Our Man in Marrakesh (U.K.)
Modesty Blaise (U.K.)
11 May
 The Fat Spy
14 May
Destination Inner Space
19 May
The Deadly Bees (U.K.)
25 May
Au Hasard Balthazar (France)
Blindfold
The Last of the Secret Agents?
The Russians Are Coming, the Russians Are Coming
27 May
The Wrong Box (U.K.)
31 May
A Big Hand for the Little Lady
June 1966
1 June
The Daydreamer
7 June
Fireball 500
8 June
Boy, Did I Get a Wrong Number!
9 June
The Glass Bottom Boat
Paradise, Hawaiian Style
10 June
Nevada Smith
15 June
Assault on a Queen
Duel at Diablo
Munster, Go Home!
Stagecoach
The Endless Summer
21 June
The Blue Max
22 June
Around the World Under the Sea
Who's Afraid of Virginia Woolf?
29 June
A Fine Madness
Walk, Don't Run

July–September
July 1966
1 July
Incident at Phantom Hill
7 July
Three on a Couch
12 July
A Man and a Woman (France)
13 July
How to Steal a Million
14 July
Torn Curtain
20 July
War and Peace Part II (U.S.S.R)
The Wild Angels
29 July
Lt. Robin Crusoe, U.S.N.
30 July
Batman
31 July
The War of the Gargantuas (Japan)
August 1966
3 August
The Man Called Flintstone
This Property Is Condemned
5 August
Daleks – Invasion Earth: 2150 A.D. (U.K.) 
10 August
The Idol
13 August
Return of Daimajin (Japan)
16 August
The Plainsman
24 August
Alfie
Fantastic Voyage
31 August
Persona (Sweden)
What Did You Do in the War, Daddy?
September 1966
1 September
Waco
2 September
The Brides of Fu Manchu
7 September
Beau Geste
8 September
After the Fox
Kiss the Girls and Make Them Die
14 September
Ambush Bay
Lost Command
15 September
The Appaloosa
Chelsea Girls
16 September
Fahrenheit 451 (U.K.)
28 September
The Bible: In the Beginning...

October–December
October 1966
5 October
Seconds
9 October
Alvarez Kelly
10 October
Hawaii
11 October
Mister Buddwing
12 October
Dead Heat on a Merry-Go-Round
13 October
Any Wednesday
16 October
A Funny Thing Happened on the Way to the Forum (U.S./U.K.)
The Poppy Is Also a Flower
17 October
Georgy Girl
Spinout
19 October
The Fortune Cookie
Return of the Seven
23 October
Ride in the Whirlwind
The Shooting
24 October
10:30 P.M. Summer
26 October
Way...Way Out
27 October
Texas Across the River
28 October
An American Dream
Chamber of Horrors
Nashville Rebel
November 1966
2 November
Not with My Wife, You Don't!
The Professionals
What's Up, Tiger Lily?
5 November
Chappaqua
7 November
Cul-de-sac
8 November
Madame X
10 November
Is Paris Burning? (France)
Penelope
Wings (U.S.S.R)
18 November
Let's Kill Uncle
19 November
Castle of Evil
December 1966
1 December
Follow Me, Boys!
8 December
La Grande Vadrouille (France)/(U.K.)
9 December
Once Before I Die
Triple Cross
You're a Big Boy Now
10 December
Daimajin Strikes Again (Japan)
12 December
A Man for All Seasons
Thunderbirds Are Go
15 December
The Good, the Bad and the Ugly
The Quiller Memorandum
16 December
Andrei Rublev (U.S.S.R)
17 December
El Dorado
Godzilla vs. the Sea Monster (Japan)
Rage
18 December
Blowup
20 December
Murderers' Row
The Sand Pebbles
21 December
Gambit
Grand Prix
21 December
King of Hearts (France)
22 December
Funeral in Berlin (U.K./U.S.)
30 December
One Million Years B.C. (U.K.)

Notable films released in 1966
United States unless stated

#
 10:30 P.M. Summer, directed by Jules Dassin and starring Melina Mercouri and Romy Schneider
 7 Women, the last film of John Ford, starring Anne Bancroft, Flora Robson, Margaret Leighton, Mildred Dunnock, Anna Lee

A
 Aakhri Khat (The Last Letter) – (India)
 After the Fox, starring Peter Sellers and Victor Mature
 Alfie, directed by Lewis Gilbert, starring Michael Caine, Shelley Winters, Millicent Martin – (U.K.)
 Alice in Wonderland, a TV film starring John Gielgud, Peter Cook, Peter Sellers – (U.K.)
 Alvarez Kelly, starring William Holden
 Ambush Bay, starring Hugh O'Brian, Mickey Rooney and James Mitchum
 An American Dream, starring Stuart Whitman, Janet Leigh, Eleanor Parker
 Amrapali, starring Vyjayanthimala and Sunil Dutt – (India)
 Andrei Rublev, directed by Andrei Tarkovsky – (U.S.S.R.)
 The Appaloosa, starring Marlon Brando
 Arabesque, directed by Stanley Donen, starring Sophia Loren and Gregory Peck
 Around the World Under the Sea, starring Lloyd Bridges
 As Long as You've Got Your Health (Tant qu'on a la santé), directed by and starring Pierre Étaix – (France)
 Assault on a Queen, starring Frank Sinatra, Virna Lisi, Anthony Franciosa
 Au Hasard Balthazar (Chosen by Lot Balthazar), directed by Robert Bresson – (France/Sweden)
 Aybolit-66 – (U.S.S.R.)

B
 Bariera (Barrier), directed by Jerzy Skolimowski – (Poland)
 Batman, starring Adam West, Burt Ward, Burgess Meredith, Cesar Romero, Lee Meriwether, Frank Gorshin
 The Battle of Algiers, directed by Gillo Pontecorvo - Golden Lion winner – (Italy/Algeria)
 Beau Geste, directed by Douglas Heyes
 Beregis Avtomobilya (Beware of the Automobile) – (U.S.S.R.)
 The Bible: In the Beginning..., directed by John Huston, starring Stephen Boyd, Franco Nero, Ava Gardner, Richard Harris, Peter O'Toole
 The Big Gundown (La resa dei conti), starring Lee Van Cleef – (Italy)
 A Big Hand for the Little Lady, starring Henry Fonda, Joanne Woodward, Jason Robards, Burgess Meredith, Kevin McCarthy
 The Birds, the Bees and the Italians (Signore & Signori), directed by Pietro Germi – (Italy)
 Birds Do It, starring Soupy Sales
 Black Girl (La Noire de...), directed by Ousmane Sembène – (France/Senegal)
 Blindfold, directed by Philip Dunne, starring Rock Hudson and Claudia Cardinale
 Blowup, directed by Michelangelo Antonioni, starring David Hemmings and Vanessa Redgrave—winner of Palme d'Or, 1967 Cannes Film Festival – (Italy/U.K./U.S.)
 The Blue Max, starring George Peppard, James Mason, Ursula Andress – (U.K.)
 Borom Sarret (The Wagoner) – (Senegal)
 Born Free, starring Virginia McKenna and Bill Travers – (U.K.)
 Boy, Did I Get a Wrong Number!, starring Bob Hope, Phyllis Diller, Elke Sommer
 A Bullet for the General (El Chucho, quién sabe?), starring Gian Maria Volonté and Klaus Kinski – (Italy)

C
 Cairo 30 (Al-Kahira 30), directed by Salāḥ Abu Seif – (Egypt)
 Carry On Screaming!, starring Harry H. Corbett and Kenneth Williams – (U.K.)
 Cast a Giant Shadow, starring Kirk Douglas, Senta Berger, Yul Brynner, John Wayne and Frank Sinatra
 Chafed Elbows, directed by Robert Downey Sr.
 Chappaqua, featuring William S. Burroughs
 The Chase, directed by Arthur Penn, starring Marlon Brando, Jane Fonda, Angie Dickinson and Robert Redford
 Chelsea Girls, directed by Andy Warhol, starring Nico
Chimes at Midnight (a.k.a. Falstaff), directed by and starring Orson Welles, with Jeanne Moreau and John Gielgud – (France/Spain/Switzerland)
Cinerama's Russian Adventure, a documentary on the U.S.S.R. introduced by Bing Crosby
 Circus of Fear, starring Christopher Lee, Leo Genn, Klaus Kinski– (U.K.)
 Closely Watched Trains (Ostře sledované vlaky), directed by Jiří Menzel – (Czechoslovakia)
 Come Drink with Me (Da zui xia), directed by King Hu – (Hong Kong)
 The Crazy-Quilt, directed by John Korty
 Cul-de-sac, directed by Roman Polanski, starring Donald Pleasence and Françoise Dorléac – (U.K.)
 Curse of the Swamp Creature, starring  John Agar, Francine York
 Curse of the Vampires (Dugo ng vampira, a.k.a. Blood of the Vampires or Creatures of Evil), directed by Gerardo de León – (Philippines)
 Cyborg 2087, starring Michael Rennie and Wendell Corey

D
 Daimajin, directed by Kimiyoshi Yasuda – (Japan)
 Daisies (Sedmikrásky), directed by Věra Chytilová – (Czechoslovakia)
 Daleks – Invasion Earth: 2150 A.D., starring Peter Cushing – (U.K.)
 The Daydreamer, a Rankin-Bass and Embassy Pictures stop-motion/live-action film
 Dead Heat on a Merry-Go-Round, starring James Coburn, Camilla Sparv, Robert Webber and Rose Marie
 The Deadly Bees, directed by Freddie Francis and starring Suzanna Leigh – (U.K.)
 Death of a Bureaucrat (La muerte de un burócrata), directed by Tomás Gutiérrez Alea – (Cuba)
 The Defector, directed by Raoul Lévy and starring Montgomery Clift, Hardy Krüger and Macha Méril – (France/West Germany)
 Degueyo, directed by Giuseppe Vari – (Italy)
 Destination Inner Space, starring Gary Merrill and Sheree North
 The Diabolical Dr. Z (Miss Muerte), directed by Jesús Franco – (France/Spain)
 Dimension 5, starring Jeffrey Hunter
 Django, starring Franco Nero – (Italy/Spain)
 Don't Look Now, We're Being Shot At (La grande vadrouille), starring Terry-Thomas and Bourvil – (France/U.K.)
 Le deuxieme souffle (a.k.a. Second Breath), directed by Jean-Pierre Melville, starring Lino Ventura – (France)
 Dr. Goldfoot and the Girl Bombs (Le spie vengono dal semifreddo), directed by Mario Bava – (Italy/U.S.)
 Dracula: Prince of Darkness, starring Christopher Lee – (U.K.)
 Drop Dead Darling, starring Tony Curtis
 Duel at Diablo, starring James Garner and Sidney Poitier
 Dutchman, starring Al Freeman, Jr. and Shirley Knight

E
 Ebirah, Horror of the Deep (Gojira, Ebira, Mosura Nankai no Daikettō), directed by Jun Fukuda – (Japan)
 El Dorado, directed by Howard Hawks, starring John Wayne, Robert Mitchum and James Caan
 The Elusive Avengers (Neulovimye mstiteli), directed by Edmond Keosayan – (U.S.S.R.)
 Eye of the Devil, directed by J. Lee Thompson, starring Deborah Kerr, David Niven and Sharon Tate

F
 The Face of Another (Tanin no kao) – (Japan)
 Fahrenheit 451, directed by François Truffaut, starring Julie Christie and Oskar Werner – (U.K.)
 The Family Way, a Boulting brothers film, starring Hayley Mills and Hywel Bennett – (U.K.)
 Fantastic Voyage, directed by Richard Fleischer, starring Stephen Boyd and Raquel Welch
 The Fat Spy, starring Phyllis Diller, Jayne Mansfield, Brian Donlevy
 Fighting Elegy (Kenka erejii), directed by Seijun Suzuki – (Japan)
 A Fine Madness, starring Sean Connery and Joanne Woodward
 Fireball 500, starring Frankie Avalon, Annette Funicello, Fabian Forte
 Follow Me, Boys!, directed by Norman Tokar, starring Fred MacMurray, Vera Miles, Kurt Russell
 For Love and Gold (L'armata Brancaleone), directed by Mario Monicelli, starring Vittorio Gassman – (Italy)
 The Fortune Cookie (a.k.a. Meet Whiplash Willie), directed by Billy Wilder, starring Jack Lemmon and Walter Matthau
 Frankie and Johnny, starring Elvis Presley and Donna Douglas
 Funeral in Berlin, starring Michael Caine – (U.K.)
 A Funny Thing Happened on the Way to the Forum, directed by Richard Lester, starring Zero Mostel, Jack Gilford, Phil Silvers, Michael Crawford – (U.S./U.K.)

G
 Galia, directed by Georges Lautner and starring Mireille Darc – (France/Italy)
 Gambit, starring Michael Caine and Shirley MacLaine
 The Game Is Over (La curée), directed by Roger Vadim and starring Jane Fonda – (France/Italy)
 Gamera vs. Barugon, directed by Shigeo Tanaka – (Japan)
 Georgy Girl, directed by Silvio Narizzano, starring Lynn Redgrave, James Mason and Alan Bates – (U.K.)
The Ghost and Mr. Chicken, starring Don Knotts
The Ghost in the Invisible Bikini, starring Deborah Walley, Tommy Kirk, Nancy Sinatra
The Glass Bottom Boat, starring Doris Day and Rod Taylor
 Godzilla vs. the Sea Monster (Gojira, Ebira, Mosura Nankai no Daikettō) – (Japan)
 The Good, the Bad and the Ugly, directed by Sergio Leone, starring Clint Eastwood, Eli Wallach and Lee Van Cleef– (Italy)
 Grand Prix, directed by John Frankenheimer, starring James Garner, Yves Montand, Toshiro Mifune, Eva Marie Saint, Jessica Walter
 The Great St Trinian's Train Robbery, starring Frankie Howerd and Dora Bryan – (U.K.)
 The Group, directed by Sidney Lumet, starring Candice Bergen, Shirley Knight, Joan Hackett, Joanna Pettet and Jessica Walter
 Gunpoint, starring Audie Murphy, Joan Staley and Warren Stevens

H
 Harper, starring Paul Newman, Robert Wagner, Lauren Bacall, Pamela Tiffin, Julie Harris, Arthur Hill, Janet Leigh
 Hawaii, directed by George Roy Hill, starring Julie Andrews, Max von Sydow, Richard Harris
 The Hawks and the Sparrows (Uccellacci e uccellini), directed by Pier Paolo Pasolini, starring Totò – (Italy)
 The Hellbenders (I Crudeli), starring Joseph Cotten – (Italy)
 Here Is Your Life (Här har du ditt liv) – (Sweden)
 The Hills Run Red (Un Fiume di dollari), directed by Carlo Lizzani – (Italy)
 Hold On!, starring Peter Noone and Shelley Fabares
 How to Steal a Million, directed by William Wyler, starring Audrey Hepburn and Peter O'Toole
 Hotel Paradiso, directed by Peter Glenville and starring Alec Guinness – (U.K.)
 The Hunchback of Soho (Der Bucklige von Soho), directed by Alfred Vohrer – (West Germany)
 Hunger (Sult) – (Denmark/Norway/Sweden)
 The Hunt (La Caza), directed by Carlos Saura – (Spain)

I
The Idol, directed by Daniel Petrie and starring Jennifer Jones and Michael Parks – (U.K.)
Incident at Phantom Hill, directed by Earl Bellamy
 Is Paris Burning? (Paris brûle-t-il?), directed by René Clément, starring Jean-Paul Belmondo, Charles Boyer, Leslie Caron – (France/United States)
 Island of Terror, starring Peter Cushing, Edward Judd, Carole Gray
 It Happened Here, starring Sebastian Shaw – (U.K.)

J
 Jack Frost (Морозко), directed by Alexander Rou – (U.S.S.R.)
 John F. Kennedy: Years of Lightning, Day of Drums, a documentary narrated by Gregory Peck and directed by Bruce Herschensohn
 Johnny Reno, starring Jane Russell
 Johnny Yuma, directed by Romolo Girolami and starring Mark Damon – (Italy)
 Judith, starring Sophia Loren and Peter Finch – (Israel/U.K./U.S.)

K
 Kaleidoscope, directed by Jack Smight, starring Warren Beatty – (U.K.)
 Khartoum, directed by Basil Dearden, starring Charlton Heston and Laurence Olivier – (U.K.)
 Kill, Baby, Kill, directed by  Mario Bava– (Italy)
 King of Hearts (Le roi de cœur), directed by Philippe de Broca, starring Alan Bates – (France)
 Kriminal – (Italy/Spain)

L
 Let's Kill Uncle, directed by William Castle
 Lightning Bolt (Operazione Goldman), directed by Antonio Margheriti – (Italy)
 Lord Love a Duck, starring Roddy McDowall and Tuesday Weld
 Lost Command, directed by Mark Robson, starring Anthony Quinn, George Segal, Alain Delon, Claudia Cardinale
 Lt. Robin Crusoe, U.S.N., starring Dick Van Dyke and Nancy Kwan

M
 Madame X, starring Lana Turner
 Made in Paris, starring Ann-Margret, Louis Jourdan, Chad Everett, Edie Adams
 Made in U.S.A., directed by Jean-Luc Godard, starring Anna Karina and Jean-Pierre Léaud – (France)
 Mademoiselle, directed by Tony Richardson, starring Jeanne Moreau – (France/U.K.)
 Mamta, starring Ashok Kumar – (India)
 A Man and a Woman, directed by Claude Lelouch, starring Anouk Aimée and Jean-Louis Trintignant -- Palme d'Or winner – (France)
 The Man Called Flintstone, directed by Joseph Barbera and William Hanna
 A Man for All Seasons, directed by Fred Zinnemann, starring Paul Scofield, Robert Shaw, Orson Welles - winner of 6 Academy Awards and 5 BAFTAs – (U.K.)
 A Man Could Get Killed, starring James Garner and Sandra Dee
 Manos: The Hands of Fate, starring and written, directed and produced by Harold P. Warren
 Masculine-Feminine by Jean-Luc Godard, starring Jean-Pierre Léaud – (France)
 Mera Saaya (My Shadow), starring Sunil Dutt and Sadhana – (India)
 Mission to Death
 Mister Buddwing, directed by Delbert Mann, starring James Garner, Jean Simmons, Angela Lansbury, Suzanne Pleshette, Katharine Ross
 Misunderstood (Incompreso), directed by Luigi Comencini – (Italy)
 Modesty Blaise, starring Monica Vitti and Terence Stamp – (U.K.)
 Moment to Moment, starring Jean Seberg and Honor Blackman
 Morgan! (a.k.a. Morgan: A Suitable Case for Treatment), directed by Karel Reisz – (U.K.)
 Munster, Go Home!, starring Fred Gwynne, Yvonne De Carlo, Al Lewis
 Murderers' Row, starring Dean Martin (as Matt Helm), with Karl Malden, Camilla Sparv, Ann-Margret
My Wife, the Director General, directed by Fatin Abdel Wahab, starring Salah Zulfikar and Shadia – (Egypt)

N
 Namu, the Killer Whale, directed by László Benedek
 Navajo Joe, starring Burt Reynolds – (Italy/Spain)
 Nayak, directed by Satyajit Ray – (India)
 Nevada Smith, starring Steve McQueen, Karl Malden, Martin Landau, Suzanne Pleshette and Arthur Kennedy
 Night Games (Nattlek), directed by Mai Zetterling and starring Ingrid Thulin – (Sweden)
 Nobody Wanted to Die (Niekas nenorėjo mirti) – (U.S.S.R.)
 Not with My Wife, You Don't!, starring Tony Curtis, George C. Scott and Virna Lisi
 The Nun (La religieuse), directed by Jacques Rivette, starring Anna Karina – (France)

O
 Once Before I Die, starring Ursula Andress and John Derek
 One Million Years B.C., starring Raquel Welch – (U.K.)
 Operazione San Gennaro (a.k.a. The Treasure of San Gennaro), starring Nino Manfredi and Senta Berger – (Italy)
 The Oscar, starring Stephen Boyd, Elke Sommer, Jill St. John, Tony Bennett
 Our Man Flint, starring James Coburn
 Our Man in Marrakesh, a.k.a. Bang! Bang! You're Dead!, starring Tony Randall

P
 The Pad and How to Use It, directed by Brian G. Hutton
 Paradise, Hawaiian Style, starring Elvis Presley
 Penelope, starring Natalie Wood, Peter Falk, Dick Shawn, Jonathan Winters, Ian Bannen and Arlene Golonka
 Le Père Noël a les yeux bleus (Father Christmas Has Blue Eyes), starring Jean-Pierre Léaud – (France)
 Persona, directed by Ingmar Bergman, starring Bibi Andersson and Liv Ullmann – (Sweden)
 Pharaoh (Faraon), directed by Jerzy Kawalerowicz – (Poland)
 Phool Aur Patthar, starring Dharmendra – (India)
 Picture Mommy Dead, starring Don Ameche and Zsa Zsa Gabor
 The Plague of the Zombies, starring André Morell – (U.K.)
 The Plainsman, starring Don Murray, Abby Dalton and Leslie Nielsen
 The Poppy Is Also a Flower, directed by Terence Young, starring Senta Berger, Stephen Boyd, Rita Hayworth, Yul Brynner and Angie Dickinson
 The Pornographers (Erogotoshitachi yori Jinruigaku nyumon), directed by Shōhei Imamura – (Japan)
 The Priest and the Girl (O Padre e a Moça) – (Brazil)
 The Professionals, directed by Richard Brooks, starring Lee Marvin, Burt Lancaster, Robert Ryan, Woody Strode, Jack Palance and Claudia Cardinale
The Projected Man, starring Mary Peach, Bryant Haliday and Ronald Allen– (U.K.)

Q
 Queen of Blood, starring John Saxon, Basil Rathbone and Dennis Hopper
 The Quiller Memorandum, starring George Segal, Alec Guinness, Max von Sydow and Senta Berger – (U.K./U.S.)

R
Rage, starring Glenn Ford and Stella Stevens
 The Rare Breed, starring James Stewart, Maureen O'Hara, Brian Keith and Juliet Mills
 A Report on the Party and the Guests (O slavnosti a hostech), directed by Jan Němec – (Czechoslovakia)
 The Reptile, starring Noel Willman, Ray Barrett and Jennifer Daniel– (U.K.)
 Return of the Seven, starring Yul Brynner, Robert Fuller, Claude Akins and Warren Oates
Ride in the Whirlwind, directed by Monte Hellman, starring Jack Nicholson and Millie Perkins
Ringo and His Golden Pistol (Johnny Oro), directed by Sergio Corbucci and starring Mark Damon – (Italy)
 Roman Candles, directed by John Waters
 Rondo, directed by Zvonimir Berković– (Yugoslavia)
 Rosalie, a short directed by Walerian Borowczyk – (France)
 The Round-Up (Szegénylegények), directed by Miklós Jancsó – (Hungary)
 Run, Appaloosa, Run, starring Rex Allen
 The Russians Are Coming, the Russians Are Coming, directed by Norman Jewison, starring Alan Arkin, Jonathan Winters, Carl Reiner and Eva Marie Saint

S
 The Sand Pebbles, directed by Robert Wise, starring Steve McQueen, Richard Attenborough, Candice Bergen and Richard Crenna
 The Sandwich Man, starring Michael Bentine and Dora Bryan – (U.K.)
 Savage Pampas, starring Robert Taylor, Ron Randell and Marc Lawrence (U.S./Spain/Argentina)
 Seconds, directed by John Frankenheimer, starring Rock Hudson
 The She Beast, starring  Barbara Steele, John Karlsen, Ian Ogilvy
 Shiroi Kyotō (The White Tower) – (Japan)
 The Shooting, starring Warren Oates, Jack Nicholson and Millie Perkins
 Sri Krishna Pandaveeyam, directed by and starring N. T. Rama Rao – (India)
 The Silencers, starring Dean Martin, Stella Stevens, Daliah Lavi, Cyd Charisse and Nancy Kovack
 The Singing Nun, starring Debbie Reynolds and Greer Garson
 Sound of Horror, starring James Philbrook, Arturo Fernandez and Soledad Miranda
 Spinout, starring Elvis Presley
 The Spy with a Cold Nose, directed by Daniel Petrie – (U.K.)
 Stagecoach, starring Ann-Margret, Bing Crosby, Red Buttons, Alex Cord, Mike Connors and Stefanie Powers
 Stop the World – I Want to Get Off, directed by Philip Saville
 Suraj, starring Vyjayanthimala and Rajendra Kumar – (India)
 The Swinger, starring Ann-Margret, Tony Franciosa and Yvonne Romain
 The Sword of Doom (Dai-bosatsu tōge) – (Japan)

T
 Tarzan and the Valley of Gold, starring Mike Henry and Nancy Kovack
 Teesri Kasam (Third Oath), starring Raj Kapoor – (India)
 Texas Across the River, starring Dean Martin, Alain Delon, Rosemary Forsyth, Peter Graves, Joey Bishop
 They're a Weird Mob, directed by Powell and Pressburger – (Australia)
 This Property Is Condemned, directed by Sydney Pollack, starring Natalie Wood, Robert Redford, Charles Bronson, Kate Reid
 Three on a Couch, directed by and starring Jerry Lewis, with Janet Leigh, Leslie Parrish, Mary Ann Mobley
 Thunderbirds Are Go, produced by Gerry Anderson and Sylvia Anderson, voices of Peter Dyneley, Shane Rimmer, Matt Zimmerman, David Graham, Christine Finn, Sylvia Anderson, Jeremy Wilkin, Ray Barrett
 Time to Die (Tiempo de morir), directed by Arturo Ripstein, starring Marga López and Jorge Martínez de Hoyos – (Mexico)
 Tokyo Drifter (Tōkyō nagaremono), directed by Seijun Suzuki – (Japan)
 Torn Curtain, directed by Alfred Hitchcock, starring Paul Newman and Julie Andrews
 Trace of Stones (Spur der Steine) – (East Germany)
 The Trap, starring Rita Tushingham and Oliver Reed – (U.K./Canada)
 Triple Cross, starring Christopher Plummer, Claudine Auger, Gert Fröbe – (U.K./France)
 The Trouble with Angels, directed by Ida Lupino, starring Rosalind Russell and Hayley Mills
 Trunk to Cairo, directed by Menahem Golan, starring Audie Murphy – (Israel)
 The Trygon Factor, starring Stewart Granger, Susan Hampshire and Robert Morley – (U.K./West Germany)

U
 The Ugly Dachshund, directed by Norman Tokar and starring Dean Jones and Suzanne Pleshette
 Ukamau (And So it Is) – (Bolivia)
 The Uncle, directed by Desmond Davis and starring Rupert Davies – (U.K.)

V 

 A Very Handy Man (Liolà), directed by Alessandro Blasetti – (Italy)
 Very Happy Alexander (Alexandre le bienheureux), directed by Yves Robert, starring Philippe Noiret – (France)

W
 Waco, starring Jane Russell and Howard Keel
 Walk, Don't Run, starring Cary Grant (in his final film), Samantha Eggar, Jim Hutton
 The War Is Over (La Guerre est Finie), directed by Alain Resnais, starring Yves Montand and Ingrid Thulin – (France)
 The War of the Gargantuas (Furankenshutain no Kaijū: Sanda tai Gaira) – (Japan)
 Way...Way Out, starring Jerry Lewis and Connie Stevens
 What Did You Do in the War, Daddy?, directed by Blake Edwards, starring James Coburn and Dick Shawn
 Where the Spies Are, directed by Val Guest and starring David Niven – (U.K.)
 Who Are You, Polly Maggoo? (Qui êtes vous, Polly Maggoo?) – (France)
 Who's Afraid of Virginia Woolf?, directed by Mike Nichols, starring Elizabeth Taylor, (Best Actress Oscar), Richard Burton, George Segal, Sandy Dennis
 The Wild Angels, starring Peter Fonda and Nancy Sinatra
 Wings (Крылья), directed by Larisa Shepitko – (U.S.S.R.)
 Winnetou and the Crossbreed (Winnetou und das Halbblut Apanatschi), directed by Harald Philipp – (West Germany)
 Winnie the Pooh and the Honey Tree (animated short)
 The Witches, starring  Joan Fontaine
 The Wrong Box, starring John Mills, Michael Caine, Peter Cook, Nanette Newman – (U.K.)

Y
 Yesterday Girl, directed by Alexander Kluge – (West Germany)
 Young Törless (Der junge Törless), directed by Volker Schlöndorff – (West Germany)
 You're a Big Boy Now, directed by Francis Ford Coppola, starring Peter Kastner, Elizabeth Hartman, Karen Black, Julie Harris

Z 

 Zatoichi's Pilgrimage (Zatōichi umi o wataru), directed by Kazuo Ikehiro – (Japan)
 Zatoichi's Vengeance (Zatōichi no uta ga kikoeru) is a 1966 Japanese chambara film directed by Tokuzō Tanaka

Short film series
 Looney Tunes (1930–1969)
 Merrie Melodies (1931–1969)
 Sylvester the Cat (1944-1966)
 Speedy Gonzales (1953–1968)
 Daffy Duck (1937–1968)

Births
 January 2 - Kate Hodge, American actress and producer
 January 13 - Patrick Dempsey, American actor
 January 17 - Joshua Malina, American actor
 January 20 – Rainn Wilson, American actor, comedian, writer, director and producer
 January 24 - Julie Dreyfus, French actress
 February 1 - Anthony Johnson, American actor and comedian (died 2021)
 February 4 - Piret Kalda, Estonian actress
 February 12 - Lochlyn Munro, Canadian actor
 February 13 - Neal McDonough, American actor and producer
 February 14 - Kristen Dalton (actress), American actress
 February 15 - Mo Gallini, American actor
 February 24
Ben Miller, English actor
Billy Zane, American actor
 February 25
Alexis Denisof, American actor
Téa Leoni, American actress
 February 27 - Donal Logue, Canadian-Irish actor, producer and writer
 March 1 - Zack Snyder, American director, producer, screenwriter and cinematographer
 March 5 - Aasif Mandvi, British-American actor and comedian
 March 9 - Alison Doody, Irish model and actress
 March 14 - Elise Neal, American actress
 March 23 - Marin Hinkle, American actress
 March 26 - Michael Imperioli, American actor
 April 8 - Robin Wright, American actress
 April 9 - Cynthia Nixon, American actress
 April 13 - Andy Nyman, English actor, director and writer
 April 14 - Lloyd Owen, British actor
 April 22 - Jeffrey Dean Morgan, American actor and producer
 April 27 - Matt Reeves, American director, producer and screenwriter
 May 10 - Ilian Djevelekov, Bulgarian film director and producer 
 May 12 - Stephen Baldwin, American actor
 May 15 - Greg Wise, English actor and producer
 May 16 - Scott Reeves, American actor and country music singer
 May 19 - Polly Walker, English actress
 May 20 - Mindy Cohn, American actress and voice actress
 May 26 - Helena Bonham Carter, English actress
 June 5 - Dwayne Hill, Canadian voice actor
 June 7 - Tom McCarthy (director), American director, screenwriter and actor
 June 16 - Phil Vischer, American filmmaker, animator, musician and voice actor
 June 17 - Jason Patric, American actor
 June 19 - Samuel West, English actor, director and voice actor
 June 22 - Emmanuelle Seigner, French actress
 June 24 - Adrienne Shelly, American actress, director and screenwriter (died 2006)
 June 27 - J. J. Abrams, American filmmaker and composer
 June 28 
 John Cusack, American actor, brother of actress Joan Cusack
 Şenay Gürler, Turkish actress
 Mary Stuart Masterson, American actress
 June 30 - Marton Csokas, New Zealand actor
 July 5 - Claudia Wells, American actress
 July 6 - Brian Posehn, American stand-up comedian, actor, voice actor, musician and writer
 July 7 - Jim Gaffigan, American stand-up comedian, actor, writer and producer
 July 8 - Mike Nawrocki, American director, animator, writer and voice actor
 July 9
Pamela Adlon, American actress, voice actress, screenwriter, producer and director
Jamie Bartlett, British-born South African actor (died 2022)
 July 10 - A. O. Scott, American film critic of The New York Times
 July 11 - Debbe Dunning, American actress
 July 12 - Tamsin Greig, English actress, narrator and comedian
 July 14 - Matthew Fox, American actor
 July 15 - Irène Jacob, French-born Swiss actress
 July 16 - Scott Derrickson, American filmmaker
 July 18 - Lori Alan, American actress and voice actress
 July 19 - Nancy Carrell, American actress, comedian and writer
 July 31 - Dean Cain, American actor, producer and television presenter
 August 1 - Dan Gerson, American screenwriter and voice actor (died 2016)
 August 5 - James Gunn, American filmmaker and actor
 August 8 - Verónica Falcón, Mexican actress
 August 10 - André Sogliuzzo, American voice actor
 August 14 - Halle Berry, American actress
 August 15
Con O'Neill (actor), English actor
Tasha de Vasconcelos, Mozambican-born Portuguese-Canadian actress
 August 17 - Matt Maiellaro, American filmmaker and voice actor
 August 18
Sarita Choudhury, British actress
María Onetto, Argentine actress (died 2023)
 August 25 - Julia Davis, English actress, comedian, director and writer
 September 1 - James Nguyen, Vietnamese filmmaker
 September 2 - Salma Hayek, Mexican actress
 September 7 - Toby Jones, English actor
 September 9 - Adam Sandler, American actor
 September 13 - Louis Mandylor, Australian actor
 September 20 - Niki Caro, New Zealand film director and screenwriter
 September 22
Ira Heiden, American actor
Ruth Jones, Welsh actress, comedian, writer and producer
 September 25 - Jason Flemyng, English actor
 October 6 - Jacqueline Obradors, American actress
 October 9 - Tim Herlihy, American actor, producer and screenwriter
 October 11 - Luke Perry, American actor (died 2019)
 October 16 - Mary Elizabeth McGlynn, American  voice actress
 October 17 - Mark Gatiss, English actor, comedian, screenwriter, director and producer
 October 19 - Jon Favreau, American actor, director, producer and screenwriter
 October 24 - Zahn McClarnon, American actor
 October 26 - Steve Valentine, English actor
 October 28
Chris Bauer, American actor
Andy Richter, American actor, writer, comedian and talk show announcer
 November 2 – David Schwimmer, American actor, director and producer
 November 3
Vincent Franklin, English actor
Jonathan Loughran, American actor
 November 6 - Peter DeLuise, American actor
 November 17 - Sophie Marceau, French actress and director
 November 19
Wolfgang Bodison, American actor
Jason Scott Lee, American actor and martial artist
 November 22 - Michael Kenneth Williams, American actor (died 2021)
 November 23 - Vincent Cassel, French actor
 November 25 - Billy Burke (actor), American actor
 December 1 - Andrew Adamson, New Zealand director, producer and screenwriter
 December 4 - Carey Means, American voice actor
 December 6 - Fred Armisen, American actor and comedian
 December 7 - C. Thomas Howell, American actor
 December 8
Tyler Mane, Canadian character actor
Scott Shepherd (actor), American actor
 December 9 - Toby Huss, American actor
 December 12 - Lydia Zimmermann, Spanish filmmaker
 December 14 - Boris Isaković. Serbian actor
 December 19 - Robert MacNaughton, American actor
 December 20 - Paul Ritter, English actor (died 2021)
 December 21 - Kiefer Sutherland, American actor
 December 24 - Diedrich Bader, American actor and voice actor
 December 31 - Maddie Taylor, American voice actress and comedian

Deaths
 January 3 - Rex Lease, 62, American actor, Rough Riding Ranger, Borrowed Wives
 January 17 - Vincent J. Donehue, 50, American director, Lonelyhearts, Sunrise at Campobello
 January 22 - Herbert Marshall, 75, British actor, The Letter, The Little Foxes
 January 31 - Elizabeth Patterson, 90, American actress, The Shocking Miss Pilgrim, Remember the Night
 February 1 
Buster Keaton, 70, American actor and director, The General, Sherlock Jr.
 Hedda Hopper, 80, American gossip columnist and actress, Sunset Boulevard, Topper
 February 9 - Sophie Tucker, 82, Russian-born American singer and actress, Thoroughbreds Don't Cry, Broadway Melody of 1938
 February 18 - Robert Rossen, 57, American writer and director, The Hustler, All the King's Men
 February 19 - James Edward Grant, 60, American writer and director, Angel and the Badman, The Alamo
 February 26 - Mientje Kling, 71, Dutch actress, The Devil in Amsterdam
 March 3 
 William Frawley, 79, American actor, Miracle on 34th Street, The Lemon Drop Kid
 Alice Pearce, 48, American actress, On the Town, The Disorderly Orderly
 March 12 - Estelita Rodriguez, 34, Cuban actress, Tropical Heat Wave, Rio Bravo
 March 26 - Cyril Hume, 66, American screenwriter, The Great Gatsby, Forbidden Planet
 April 6
 Julia Faye, 73, American actress, Chicago, The Ten Commandments
 Edna Flugrath, 73, American silent-film actress, The Derby Winner, The Pursuit of Pamela
 April 16 - Marjie Millar, 34, American actress, Money from Home, About Mrs. Leslie
 June 5 - Natacha Rambova, 69, American actress, Salomé, Monsieur Beaucaire
 June 11 - Wallace Ford, 68, British-born American actor, Another Face, 3 Ring Circus
 June 19 - Ed Wynn, 79, American actor, Alice in Wonderland, Mary Poppins
 July 5 - John P. Fulton, 63, American special effects supervisor, The Ten Commandments
 July 6 - Anne Nagel, 50, American actress, Under the Big Top, My Little Chickadee
 July 23
 Douglass Montgomery, 59, American actor, Little Women, Waterloo Bridge
 Montgomery Clift, 45, American actor, From Here to Eternity, A Place in the Sun
 August 3 - Lenny Bruce, 40, American satirist
 August 15 
Jan Kiepura, 64, Polish tenor and actor, My Song for You
Seena Owen, 71, American actress, Queen Kelly, Victory
 August 23 - Francis X. Bushman, 83, American actor, Ben-Hur, The Phantom Planet
 August 25 - Lance Comfort, 58, British director, Penn of Pennsylvania, Eight O'Clock Walk
 August 26 - Art Baker, 68, American actor, Cover Up, The Farmer's Daughter
 September 14 - Nikolai Cherkasov, 63, Soviet actor, Alexander Nevsky, Ivan The Terrible, Part II
 September 22 - Jules Furthman, 78, American screenwriter, The Big Sleep, To Have and Have Not
 October 13 - Clifton Webb, 76, American actor, Laura, The Man Who Never Was
 October 16 - George O'Hara, 67, American actor and writer, Side Street, The Grapes of Wrath
 October 23
Eugenio Bava, 80, Italian cinematographer, Cabiria, Quo Vadis
Claire McDowell, 88, American actress, The Mark of Zorro, Ben-Hur
 October 24 - Hans Dreier, 81, German art director of European and American films, Sunset Boulevard, Double Indemnity
 November 3 - Byron Barr, 49, American actor, Double Indemnity, Pitfall
 November 9 - James V. Kern, 57, American screenwriter and director, Never Say Goodbye, Two Tickets to Broadway
 December 14
Emma Dunn, 91, British actress, Mother, Life with Father
Verna Felton, 76, American actress and voice actress, Picnic, Cinderella
Richard Whorf, 60, American actor and director, Christmas Holiday, Yankee Doodle Dandy
 December 15 - Walt Disney, 65, American producer, cartoonist and studio executive, Steamboat Willie, Cinderella, Fantasia
 December 19 - Betty Kuuskemaa, 87, Estonian actress, 
 December 22
Harry Beaumont, 78, American director, The Broadway Melody, Enchanted April
Robert Keith, 68, American actor, The Lineup, Written on the Wind

Film debuts
 Candice Bergen - The Group
 Peter Boyle – The Group
 Michael Douglas - Cast a Giant Shadow
 Harrison Ford - Dead Heat on a Merry-Go-Round
 Hal Holbrook – The Group
 Stuart Margolin - Women of the Prehistoric Planet
 Bette Midler - Hawaii
 Helen Mirren - Press for Time
 Robert Pine - Gunpoint
 James Tolkan – The Three Sisters
 Lyle Waggoner - Swamp Country
 Johnny Whitaker - The Russians Are Coming, the Russians Are Coming

Notes

References

 
Film by year